The Burrel Union Elementary School District is a public school district based in Fresno County, California.

References

External links
 

School districts in Fresno County, California